Stiletto is a 1969 American crime film directed by Bernard L. Kowalski and starring Alex Cord, Britt Ekland and Patrick O'Neal. It is based on the novel Stiletto (1960) by Harold Robbins. The film marked the debut of Raul Julia.

Synopsis
A rich, jet-setting playboy has a secret life: he is also a professional Mafia hitman. When he decides it's time to retire from that life, he finds that his former employers don't like the idea that someone who knows so much about them won't be under their control anymore, and decide to send their own hitmen to eliminate him.

Cast
 Alex Cord as Count Cesare Cardinali
 Britt Ekland as Illeana
 Patrick O'Neal as Baker
 Joseph Wiseman as Matteo
 Barbara McNair as Ahn Dessie
 John Dehner as District Attorney
 Titos Vandis as Tonio
 Eduardo Ciannelli as Don Andrea
 Roy Scheider as Bennett
 Lincoln Kilpatrick as Hannibal Smith
 Louie Elias as Mann
 Luke Andreas as Macy
 Dominic Barto as Franchini
 James Tolkan as Edwards
 Amaru as Rosa
 Raul Julia as Party Guest

See also
 List of American films of 1969

References

External links

1969 films
1969 crime films
Films about contract killing
Mafia films
Films directed by Bernard L. Kowalski
Embassy Pictures films
Films based on American novels
1960s English-language films
American crime films
1960s American films